In classical antiquity, the muscle cuirass, anatomical cuirass, or heroic cuirass is a type of cuirass made to fit the wearer's torso and designed to mimic an idealized male human physique. It first appears in late Archaic Greece and became widespread throughout the 5th and 4th centuries BC. Originally made from hammered bronze plate, boiled leather also came to be used. It is commonly depicted in Greek and Roman art, where it is worn by generals, emperors, and deities during periods when soldiers used other types. 

In Roman sculpture, the muscle cuirass is often highly ornamented with mythological scenes. Archaeological finds of relatively unadorned cuirasses, as well as their depiction by artists in military scenes, indicate that simpler versions were worn in combat situations. The anatomy of muscle cuirasses intended for use might be either realistic or reduced to an abstract design; the fantastically illustrated cuirasses worn by gods and emperors in Roman statues usually incorporate realistic nipples and the navel within the scene depicted.

Use 

The cuirasses were cast in two pieces, the front and the back, then hammered. They were a development from the early Archaic bell-shaped cuirass, weighing about 25 pounds. Examples from the 5th century BC have been found in the tombs of Thracians, whose cavalrymen wore them. The earliest surviving depiction in Greek sculpture seems to be an example on a sculptural warrior's torso found on the Acropolis of Athens and dating around 470–460 BC. The muscle cuirass is also depicted on Attic red-figure pottery, which dates from around 530 BC and into the late 3rd century BC.

From around 475 to 450 BC, the muscle cuirass was shorter, covering less of the abdomen, and more nipped at the waist than in later examples. It was worn over a chitoniskos. In Neo-Attic art, the muscle cuirass was worn over a longer chiton. 

The Italian muscle cuirass lacked the shoulder-guards found on Greek examples. Examples among the Samnites and Oscans sketch a blockier torso more roughly than the anatomically realistic Greek pieces. Many examples come from graves in Campania, Etruria, and elsewhere in southern Italy.

Polybius omits the muscle cuirass in his description of the types of armor worn by the Roman army, but archaeological finds and artistic depictions suggest that it was worn in combat. The monument of Aemilius Paulus at Delphi shows two Roman infantrymen wearing mail shirts alongside three who wear muscle cuirasses. They were worn mostly by officers, and may have been molded leather as well as metal, with fringed leather (pteruges) at the armholes and lower edge. The muscle cuirass is one of the elements that distinguished a senior officer's "uniform".

Artistic qualities

Cuirasse esthétique 
The sculptural replicating of the human body in the muscle cuirass may be inspired by the concept of heroic nudity, and the development of the muscle cuirass has been linked to the idealized portraiture of the male body in Greek art.  Kenneth Clark attributes the development of an idealized standard musculature, varied from the facts of nature, to Polykleitos:

Decoration 

Hellenistic rulers added divine emblems, such as thunderbolts, to the pteruges.

Another conventional decoration is the gorgoneion, or Medusa's head, on the upper chest, and often vegetative motifs on the pectorals. One of the elements of iconography that identify the Greek Athena and the Roman Minerva, goddesses who embodied the strategic side of warfare, was a breastplate bearing a gorgoneion (see Aegis). Other deities, particularly the war gods Ares and Mars, could be portrayed with muscle cuirasses.

Roman emperors 

Among freestanding sculptures portraying Roman emperors, a common type shows the emperor wearing a highly ornamented muscle cuirass, often with a scene from mythology. Figures such as winged victories, enemies in defeat, and virtues personified represent the emperor as master of the world. Symbolic arrangements this elaborate never appear on Greek cuirasses.

The cuirass on the famous Augustus of Prima Porta is particularly ornate. In the center, a Roman officer is about to receive a Roman military standard (aquila) from a bearded "barbarian" who appears to be a Parthian. The Roman, who has a hound at his side, is most often identified as a young Tiberius, and the scene is usually read as the return in 20 BC of the standards lost at the Battle of Carrhae in 53 BC. The anatomically realistic navel (Greek omphalos, Latin umbilicus) is placed between the two central figures, slightly below ground level in relation to the feet and centered above the personification of Earth, positioned over the abdomen. Her reclining position, cornucopia, and the presence of suckling babies is common to other goddesses in Augustan art who represent peace and prosperity. Other figures include a lyre-playing Apollo riding a griffin, Diana on the back of a hind, and the quadriga of the Sun at the top.

Gallery

References

External links 

Ancient Greek military equipment
Body armor
Roman armour